Ahmose-Sitkamose, sometimes appearing as simply Sitkamose was a princess during the late 17th-early 18th Dynasties of Egypt.

Biography 
She was the only child of Kamose and as a result his heir presumptive to her father. She married prince Ahmose who was her uncle in her father's year 5. She was 14   while Ahmose was only 10. The marriage was happy but was never consummated due to Ahmose's young age. The marriage was also short-lived as she died less than a year later aged 14. Later that year Kamose also died and 10-year-old Ahmose became pharaoh as Ahmose I under the regency of his mother Ahhotep I. Ahmose heavily mourned her death (he even posthumously gave her the titles of Great Royal Wife and God's Wife of Amun) but the lack of a direct heir forced him to remarry quickly: to his sister Ahmose-Nefertari.

Sitkamose's mummy was discovered in 1881 in the Deir el-Bahari cache; it was in the coffin of a man named Pediamun who lived during the 21st Dynasty. Her mummy was unwrapped by Gaston Maspero on June 19, 1886. Sitkamose was, according to examinations, about thirty years old when she died but was actually only 14.  Grafton Eliot Smith described her as a strong-built, almost masculine woman. The mummy was damaged by tomb robbers.

References

External links
 Mummy

16th-century BC Egyptian women
16th-century BC clergy
Queens consort of the Eighteenth Dynasty of Egypt
Princesses of the Seventeenth Dynasty of Egypt
Ancient Egyptian mummies
Wives of Ahmose I
God's Wives of Amun
Ancient Egyptian priestesses